Senator Thacher may refer to:

John Boyd Thacher (1847–1909), New York State Senate
Solon O. Thacher (1830–1895), Kansas State Senate

See also
Senator Thatcher (disambiguation)